Morton Williams Supermarkets, founded in 1952, is a family-owned and operated food retailer with sixteen stores in the New York City Metropolitan area.

Morton Williams features ShopRite products as its private-label brand, supplied by ShopRite's parent company, Wakefern Food Corporation.

History
The first location opened in the Bronx in 1952, and originally operated under the independent Associated Supermarkets brand.

Locations

Morton Williams operates 14 supermarkets in Manhattan, as well as one in the Bronx and one in Jersey City. 

There are also two liquor stores in Manhattan operating under the name Morton Williams Wine & Spirits. These stores are independently owned and operated separate from the chain of supermarkets.

References

External links
 

Supermarkets of the United States
Retail companies established in 1952
1952 establishments in New York City
Companies based in the Bronx